The following is a list of people executed by the U.S. state of Texas between 1982 (when the state resumed executions) to 1989. All of the 33 people during this period were convicted of murder and have been executed by lethal injection at the Huntsville Unit in Huntsville, Texas.

Executions 1982–89
The number in the "#" column indicates the nth person executed since 1982 (when Texas resumed the death penalty). Thus, Charles Brooks Jr. was not only the first person executed in the 1980 decade, he was also the first person executed since Texas resumed the death penalty.

Notes

See also
Capital punishment in Texas

References

External links
Death Row Information. Texas Department of Criminal Justice

1982
20th-century executions by Texas
1980s-related lists
1980s in Texas